Buy a Bullet is a 2016 thriller short story written by Gregg Hurwitz. It forms a part of the  "Orphan X Thrillers" series by the author. Being a short story it was published as an electronic book.

The follow-up books in the series are "The Nowhere Man" (Released in January 2017) and "Hellbent" (released in January 2018).

References

External links
 

2016 short stories
Thriller short stories
2016 American novels
Books by Gregg Hurwitz
Minotaur Books books